Suat İsmail Mamat  (8 November 1930 – 3 February 2016) was a Turkish professional footballer who played in Turkey for Ankara Demirspor, Galatasaray S.K., Beşiktaş J.K. and Vefa S.K.

International career
Mamat made 27 appearances for the full Turkey national football team, including appearing in two matches at the 1954 FIFA World Cup finals, where he scored three goals.

He died on 3 February 2016, only two days after the death of his teammate Ali Beratlıgil.

References

External links

1930 births
2016 deaths
Turkish footballers
Turkey international footballers
Ankara Demirspor footballers
Galatasaray S.K. footballers
Beşiktaş J.K. footballers
Vefa S.K. footballers
1954 FIFA World Cup players
Mersin İdman Yurdu managers
Association football forwards
Turkish football managers
People from Bakırköy
Footballers from Istanbul